Maggie's Way is a 1981 American novel written by Martha Barron Barrett.

Overview
Maggie, a woman in her middle years, leaves her husband to find a new life.  She discovers a new beginning in a relationship with a younger woman.

References

1981 American novels
Fiction set in 1981
Signet Books books